The following is a timeline of the history of the city of Padua in the  Veneto region of Italy.

Prior to 15th century

 89 BCE - Romans in power.
 45 BCE - Patavium designated a municipium.
 350 CE - Roman Catholic Diocese of Padua established (approximate date).
 452 CE - Padua besieged by Hun forces of Attila.
 540 - Greeks in power.
 601 - Padua besieged by forces of Lombard Agilulf.
 11th century - Constitution created.
 1219 - Palazzo della Ragione built.
 1222 - University of Padua founded.
 1230 - Basilica of Saint Anthony of Padua construction begins.
 1237 - Ezzelino III da Romano in power.
 1256 - Ezzelino III ousted.
 1266 - Padua takes nearby Vicenza.
 1304 - Salt War with Venice
 1305 - Artist Giotto paints the Scrovegni Chapel (approximate date).
 1311 - Cangrande I della Scala in power.
 1318 - Jacopo I da Carrara becomes lord of Padua.
 1360 - Public clock installed (approximate date).
 1386 -  fought near Padua.

15th-19th centuries
 1404 - War of Padua begins.
 1405 - Venetians in power.
 1431 - Squarcione's school of art active.
 1472 - Printing press in operation.
 1509 - September: Siege of Padua during the War of the League of Cambrai; Venetian forces defeat those of the Holy Roman Empire.
 1526 -  built on the Piazza dei Signori.
 1540 - Accademia degli Infiammati (learned society) formed.
 1545 - Orto botanico di Padova (garden) founded.
 1548 - Italian Synagogue founded.(it)
 1594 - Anatomical Theatre of Padua built in the university's Bo Palace.
 1617 - Spanish synagogue established.
 1629 -  (library) founded.
 1631 - Plague.
 1678 - Elena Cornaro Piscopia earns PhD degree from the university.
 1767 - Prato della Valle (square) property transferred to city.
 1779 - Accademia di scienze lettere e arti (learned society) active.
 1780 - Museo civico di Padova (city museum) founded.
 1797 - Republic of Venice ends.
 1831 - Pedrocchi Café in business.
 1842 - Padova railway station opens.
 1846 -  becomes mayor.
 1857 - Biblioteca Civica di Padova (library) established.
 1866 - Padua becomes part of the Kingdom of Italy.
 1883 -  begins operating.
 1897 - Population: 82,210.

20th century

 1911 - Population: 96,230.
 1937 -  begins operating.
 1941 - Cinema Theatro Concordi built.
 1944 - Aerial bombardment of Padua during World War II.
 1947 -  becomes mayor (until 1970).
 1948 - Archivio di Stato di Padova (state archives) established.
 1953 -  (war memorial) dedicated.
 1961 -  (publisher) in business.
 1974 - Banca d'Italia building constructed.
 1977 -  begins broadcasting.
 1978 - Il Mattino di Padova newspaper begins publication.
 1980 - Palasport San Lazzaro (arena) opens.
 1981 - Stadio Plebiscito (stadium) opens.
 1982 - 28 January: Rescue of kidnapped U.S. military officer Dozier.
 1993 - Flavio Zanonato becomes mayor.
 1996 - Banca Antoniana Popolare Veneta established.

21st century

 2002 - Regional  newspaper begins publication.
 2006
 Controversial Via Anelli Wall built.
 Il Padova newspaper begins publication.(it)
 2007 - Rubber-tyred "tramway" (Translohr technology)  begins operating.
 2011 - Population: 214,125.
 2014 - Municipal election held; Massimo Bitonci becomes mayor.(it)
 2015 - 31 May: Venetian regional election, 2015 held.

See also
 
 List of mayors of Padua
 History of Veneto region (it)
 Timeline of the Republic of Venice, of which Padua was part 1405-1797

Timelines of other cities in the macroregion of Northeast Italy:(it)
 Emilia-Romagna region: Timeline of Bologna; Ferrara; Forlì; Modena; Parma; Piacenza; Ravenna; Reggio Emilia; Rimini
 Friuli-Venezia Giulia region: Timeline of Trieste
 Trentino-South Tyrol region: Timeline of Bolzano; Trento
 Veneto region: Timeline of Treviso; Venice; Verona; Vicenza

References

This article incorporates information from the Italian Wikipedia.

Bibliography

in English
 
 
 
 
 
 
 
 
  + 1870 ed.

in Italian

External links

  (city archives)
 Items related to Padua, various dates (via Europeana)
 Items related to Padua, various dates (via Digital Public Library of America)

History of Padua
Padua